Lazy Eye is a 2016 American comedy film directed by Tim Kirkman.

Cast
Lucas Near-Verbruggh - Dean
Aaron Costa Ganis - Alex
Michaela Watkins - Mel
Drew Barr - Optometrist

References

External links 

2016 films
2016 comedy films
American LGBT-related films
Gay-related films
2010s English-language films
2010s American films